The  Detroit Lions season was the franchise's 49th season in the National Football League. Under new head coach and former NFL player Monte Clark, the Lions continue to struggle with mediocrity finishing in third place again with a less than stellar record of 7–9.

This season would also be the swan song for starting quarterback Greg Landry's stellar ten-year career in Detroit, as in the offseason Landry was shipped to the Baltimore Colts for a 1979 fourth round pick (#88—Ulysses Norris), a 1979 fifth round pick (#131—Walt Brown), and a 1980 third round pick (#62—Mike Friede), in a rebuilding process begun by head coach Monte Clark.

Offseason

NFL draft 

Notes

 Detroit traded its third-round pick (67th) and seventh-round pick in 1979 to Cleveland in exchange for the rights to K Tom Skladany.
 Detroit traded DT Herb Orvis to Baltimore in exchange for the Colts' fourth-round pick (107th).
 Detroit traded P Herman Weaver to Denver in exchange for the Broncos' fourth- and sixth-round picks (109th and 165th).
 Detroit traded LB Jim Laslavic to San Diego in exchange for the Chargers' fifth- and sixth-round picks (123rd and 153rd).
 Detroit traded its ninth-round pick (233rd) to San Francisco in exchange for K Steve Mike-Mayer.

Personnel

Staff

Roster

Regular season

Schedule

Game summaries

Week 9: at Chicago Bears 

 Source: Pro-Football-Reference.com

Standings

References

External links 
 1978 Detroit Lions at Pro-Football-Reference.com

Detroit Lions
Detroit Lions seasons
1978 in sports in Michigan